General transcription factor 3C polypeptide 1 is a protein that in humans is encoded by the GTF3C1 gene.

Interactions 

GTF3C1 has been shown to interact with GTF3C4.

References

Further reading

External links 
 

Transcription factors